Ian Jardine (born 20 October 1964, in Dunfermline) is a former Scottish international rugby union player, normally playing at the Centre position.

Rugby Union Career

Amateur career
His career spanned the amateur era and the professional era. He played for Stirling County.

Late in his career he played for Cumnock RFC.

Provincial and professional career
Jardine represented Glasgow District at various levels before finally representing the professional Glasgow side, now Glasgow Warriors. He made his debut for the Warriors away to Newport RFC in the European Challenge Cup on 26 October 1996, becoming Glasgow Warrior No. 27.

International career

He received 3 caps for Scotland 'B', the first on 9 December 1989 against Ireland 'B'.

He had his first international cap 20 November 1993 against New Zealand. He participated in the Five Nations tournaments of 1994-1996 and played for Scotland in the World Cup in 1995 (three games played, beaten in the quarterfinals).

Coaching career
He became coach of Stirling County RFC.

References

External links
Statbunker Profile
 

1964 births
Living people
Scottish rugby union coaches
Scottish rugby union players
Rugby union players from Dunfermline
Glasgow Warriors players
Glasgow District (rugby union) players
Cumnock RFC players
Stirling County RFC players
Scotland international rugby union players